Jörg Hube (22 November 1943 – 19 June 2009) was a German actor and director. He died of cancer. He was buried at the Winthir Cemetery in Munich. His estate has been cared for since 2011 at the Munich literary archive Monacensia, which also organizes an exhibition of the estate.

Theatre 
Some of Hube's roles:

1973 in Plenzdorf's Die neuen Leiden des jungen W., München
1974 in Brecht's Die heilige Johanna der Schlachthöfe
1978 in Widmer's Nepal, München
1981 in Mitterer's Kein Platz für Idioten, München
1985 in Bauern sterben, München
1994 as Klosterbruder in Lessing's Nathan der Weise, München
1995 as Franz Schritt in Kroetz' Bauerntheater, München
1998 as Puntila in Brecht's Herr Puntila und sein Knecht Matti, München
1998 in Ringsgwandl's König Ludwig II. – Die volle Wahrheit
1999 as Polymestor in Euripides' Hekabe, München

Films and television programmes 
1972: Der Italiener
1972–81: Das feuerrote Spielmobil (as Herr Koch)
1976: Der Fall Bundhund (as Bundhund)
1976: Tatort: Wohnheim Westendstraße (as Bauführer)
1977: Tatort: Schüsse in der Schonzeit (as Wirt Dirscherl)
1979: Blauer Himmel, den ich nur ahne (as Ludwig Thoma)
1980: Tatort: Der Zeuge (as Kommissar Paul Enders)
1981: Der Gerichtsvollzieher (as Florian Kreittmayer)
1982: Tatort:  (as Straub)
1982: Die Weiße Rose (as Oberregierungsrat)
1983: Monaco Franze, episode 8: Macht's nur so weiter! (as Herr Röhrl)
1984: Heimat (as Otto Wohlleben)
1986: The Old Fox: Das Attentat (as Taxifahrer)
1987: Die Hausmeisterin (as Tankstellenbesitzer)
1987: The Hothouse (as Frost-Forrestier)
1988: Der Schwammerlkönig (as Champignonzüchter Antl)
1989: Löwengrube – Die Grandauers und ihre Zeit (in the first four episodes as Ludwig Grandauer, then as his son Karl Grandauer)
1994: Polizeiruf 110: Gespenster (as Polizeipräsident)
1995: Transatlantis
1996:  (as Kriminalrat Ludwig Mayerhofer)
1997:  (as Johann Burgschwaiger)
1998: Kreuzwege (as Achatius Achaz)
1999: Die Verbrechen des Professor Capellari: Tod eines Königs (as Bachhaus)
1999: Requiem for a Romantic Woman (as Oberster Richter)
2000: Café Meineid: Nimmer schee (as Hans Ferdl)
2002: Café Meineid: Schnee von gestern (as Paul Bachleitner)
2004: The Old Fox: Ein mörderisches Geheimnis (as Martin Brand)
2005: Sophie Scholl – The Final Days (as Robert Scholl)
2007: Das große Hobeditzn (as Korbinian Hobeditz)
2008: Tatort: Der oide Depp (as Robert 'Roy' Esslinger)
2008:  (as Petrus)
2009: Franzi (as Franz Ostermeier)
2009: Polizeiruf 110: Klick gemacht'' (as Hauptkommissar Friedrich Papen)

Awards 
1982 German Kleinkunstpreis in the Sparte Cabaret
1992 and 1993 Adolf-Grimme-Prize
1993 Theatre Prize of the Capital of Munich
1996 German Kabarettpreis, First Prize
1997 Prix Pantheon Category Reif & Bekloppt
1999 Schwabinger Art Award Honorary Prize
2000 Oberbayerischer Culture Prize
2009 Bayerischer Honorary Kabarettpreis

References

External links 

1943 births
2009 deaths
People from Neuruppin
Deaths from cancer in Germany
German male stage actors
German male film actors
German male television actors
20th-century German male actors
21st-century German male actors